is a Kyoto-based Japanese company specializing in the development and production of lead acid and lithium-ion batteries, used in automobiles, motorcycles and other areas including aerospace and defense applications.

History

Yuasa 

In 1909, Shichizaemon Yuasa established Yuasa Iron Works to modernize the family business, founded in 1666 as a charcoal trading business. Yuasa Iron Works began producing storage batteries in 1915, and three years later Yuasa Storage Battery Co., Ltd was established. Soon after, Yuasa Storage Battery Co., Ltd began making Japan's first automotive batteries. In 1925, Yuasa began making dry cells, and in 1941 they began making alkaline cells. The dry battery business was later spun off into Yuasa Dry Battery Co., Ltd, which later merged back into Yuasa Storage Battery Co., Ltd to form Yuasa Battery Co, Ltd, later renamed to Yuasa Corporation.

GS 

In 1904, Genzo Shimadzu (b. 1869 d. 1951) developed a high-capacity lead-acid battery to supply backup power to his factory during outages of Kyoto's then unreliable power grid. The Japanese navy purchased 400 units of this battery. Shimadzu established Japan Storage Battery Co., Ltd in 1917 and began producing automotive batteries in 1919. In 1938 they began producing alkaline batteries and in 1940 they began making high-pressure mercury lamps.

GS was established in 1917 and is an abbreviation comprising the initials of Genzou Shimadzu (the founder's name of Japan Storage Battery). He was also the founder of Shimadzu Corporation.

GS Yuasa 

In 2004, Yuasa Corporation merged with Japan Storage Battery to form GS Yuasa Corporation.

As of 2014, GS Yuasa had 9 plants for manufacturing industrial lead-acid and NiCd batteries and 5 plants for Li-Ion cells. GS Yuasa also sells other products including power supplies, lamps and motorcycle batteries. Now the top power sports battery producer, Yuasa provides nearly 90% of the batteries used in power sport vehicles in North America.

Joint ventures 
GS Yuasa was one of the active players in the electric vehicle battery industry during the late 2000s to early 2010s when numerous battery vendors largely from Japan had formed alliances with car manufacturers to enter the novel market of EV.

Lithium Energy Japan 
In 2007, GS Yuasa and Mitsubishi Motors have formed an alliance and started a joint venture named Lithium Energy Japan (LEJ) that develops and manufactures lithium-ion batteries for automotive and industrial use. The Mitsubishi i-MiEV, the first mass-produced electric car, was equipped with the batteries from LEJ.

Blue Energy Co. 
In 2009, Honda partnered with GS Yuasa to set up an EV battery supplier Blue Energy Co. (BEC). The HVs from Honda including Civic Hybrid have been powered by lithium-ion batteries manufactured by BEC which has a production facility in Kyoto. However, Honda has been in search for new partners aside from BEC since the late 2010s, teaming up with various companies like Nissan, General Motors, and CATL.

Lithium Energy & Power GmbH 
In 2014, Robert Bosch GmbH and GS Yuasa partnered on next-gen Li-ion EV battery with the ambitious goals to double energy density and make it to mass market by 2020 while lowering the cost by half as well. The venture has ended without an meaningful outcome after Bosch has decided to outsource battery cell manufacturing in 2018.

Overseas operations

United States

Yuasa Battery Inc 

Yuasa Battery, Inc (U.S.A.) was established in 1965. In 1979, Yuasa began producing motorcycle batteries in a joint venture established with General Battery Corporation in Laureldale, PA a few years earlier. Today, Yuasa Battery Inc supplies batteries for motorcycles, scooters, personal watercraft, all-terrain vehicles (ATV), and side by sides (UTV).

Yuasa-Exide Inc 

In 1987 Fruit of the Loom sold its General Battery Corporation to Exide Corporation. In 1991, Yuasa Battery Co. Ltd (Japan) bought Exide's industrial battery division, forming Yuasa-Exide Inc, later renamed to Yuasa Inc. In 2000, a management buyout of Yuasa Inc's industrial battery business formed Enersys.

Today, Enersys sells a wide variety of batteries.

Europe 

In 1981, Yuasa established one company in the UK to manufacture VRLA batteries and another for sales and distribution. They later established companies in Germany, France and Italy for sales and distribution. Yuasa Corporation bought a 50% share in Lucas Batteries Ltd in 1988, forming Lucas-Yuasa Batteries Ltd. Yuasa bought the remaining 50% of Lucas Batteries in 1997, forming Yuasa Automotive Batteries Europe Ltd which marketed automotive batteries under Lucas and other names until 2006, when Yuasa began marketing automotive batteries in Europe under their own name. In 2002, Yuasa Battery Europe Ltd was formed as a parent company for Yuasa's various European sales companies.

Today, Yuasa Battery Europe Ltd sells a variety of batteries.

Australia

Century Batteries Australia is a division of Century Yuasa Batteries Pty Ltd and an affiliate of the GS Yuasa Corporation.

Vietnam 
GS Battery VietNam Co., Ltd is a company 100% foreign owned capital, joint venture between GS-Yuasa Corporation and Mitsubishi Corporation.

Miscellaneous

Boeing 787 
The parent company in Japan was linked to faulty electrics used in Boeing's 787 Dreamliner plane. The electrical battery control system was made by Thales Group which also selected GS Yuasa. All Nippon Airways (ANA) had replaced 10 batteries (of 17 planes) while Japan Airlines (JAL) had replaced "several" on its 7 planes, before recent mishaps. As of January 29, 2013, the Japan Transport Safety Board has approved the Yuasa factory quality control and continues to investigate the damaged battery of the ANA 787. Meanwhile, the American National Transportation Safety Board continues to look for defects in the Boston JAL 787 battery.

Gallery

See also

 Smart BEST, an experimental train powered by GS Yuasa lithium-ion batteries

References

External links
 Yuasa Europe
 GS Yuasa Corporation 
 GS Yuasa Lithium Power (USA)
 Yuasa Corporation (Japan) 
 Yuasa Batteries, Inc. (United States)
 GS Yuasa to provide batteries for Hybrid Cars
 Mitsubishi forms JV with GS Yuasa to build lithium ion batteries
 GS Yuasa Selected as Supplier of Li-ion cells for RBSP Mission
  Wiki collection of bibliographic works on GS Yuasa

Manufacturing companies based in Kyoto
Auto parts suppliers of Japan
Electronics companies of Japan
Defense companies of Japan
Motor vehicle battery manufacturers
Electrical equipment manufacturers
Electric vehicle battery manufacturers
Companies listed on the Tokyo Stock Exchange
Japanese companies established in 2004
Japanese brands
Mitsui
1666 establishments in Japan